This is a list of French television related events from 1978.

Events
26 March - Joël Prévost is selected to represent France at the 1978 Eurovision Song Contest with his song "Il y aura toujours des violons". He is selected to be the twenty-second French Eurovision entry during a national final.
22 April - The 23rd Eurovision Song Contest is held at the Palais des Congrès in Paris. Israel wins the contest with the song "A-Ba-Ni-Bi", performed by Izhar Cohen and the Alphabeta.

Debuts
4 January - 1, rue Sésame (1978-1982)

Television shows

1940s
Le Jour du Seigneur (1949–present)

1950s

Présence protestante (1957-)

1960s
Les Dossiers de l'écran (1967-1991)
Monsieur Cinéma (1967-1980)
Les Animaux du monde (1969-1990)
Alain Decaux raconte (1969-1987)
Télé-Philatélie

1970s
Aujourd'hui Madame (1970-1982)
30 millions d'amis (1976-2016)
Les Jeux de 20 Heures (1976-1987)

Ending this year
La Piste aux étoiles (1956-1978)
La Tête et les Jambes (1960-1978)

Births
22 July - Louise Ekland, British-born TV presenter

Deaths

See also
1978 in France
List of French films of 1978